Sayyed Bagher Khan Muhazab Al Dawleh Kazemi also known as Bagher Kazemi (10 February 1892–10 November 1977), was an Iranian politician, diplomat and minister. He served as Iran's ambassador to several countries, including France, Turkey and Afghanistan and Governor of East Azerbaijan Province form March 1932 to August 1933.

Following the overthrow of Mohammad Mosaddegh Kazemi and four other political figures close to him, including Shamseddin Amir Alaei, were arrested on the orders of Teymur Bakhtiar, military governor of Tehran, in May 1955.

References

20th-century diplomats
20th-century Iranian politicians
1892 births
1977 deaths
Ambassadors of Iran to France
Ambassadors of Iran to Turkey
Ambassadors of Iran to Afghanistan
Government ministers of Iran
Iranian governors
Recipients of the Legion of Honour
Foreign ministers of Iran